Renārs Vucāns (born 4 November 1974) is a retired Latvian football midfielder.

References

1974 births
Living people
Latvian footballers
Skonto FC players
FK RFS players
FK Rīga players
FK Auda players
Association football midfielders
Latvia international footballers